Jon Courtney is a British singer, guitarist, and keyboard player, of the rock band Pure Reason Revolution. He was also the sole songwriter (except "The Bright Ambassadors of Morning" credited to Courtney/Jong) on their first two albums. Outside of Pure Reason Revolution, Courtney is involved in the DJ set All Bangers No Mash under the pseudonym "Cedo Simplex", and is one member of the duo KC Blitz.

Background
Courtney and his brother and former bandmate Andrew Courtney grew up in Reading, Berkshire, as did fellow Pure Reason Revolution members Chloe Alper and Jamie Willcox. In an interview, Courtney points to the precise moment, at approximately age 11, when he decided he wanted to be a musician, when he saw the band Nirvana on the MTV Awards in about 1991. Courtney said, "[F]rom that point on it was like "wow!" – I was transfixed by the TV – "this is what I've got to do, there's no question." The next day I was just hassling my mum for a guitar. I have to play guitar and then I started a huge obsession with Nirvana and the whole grunge scene. So that's definitely a strong turning point for me." He credited the appeal of the moment to the "passion in the music and the passion of the audience's reaction to the music."

Courtney began playing in bands at his secondary school Reading Blue Coat School. He and his brother were involved in the punk band Gel, which was scouted and signed by Seymour Stein, the founder of Sire Records. Uncut magazine reviewed their first (and only) album Sparkly Things (produced by Julian Standen of The Lemonheads) describing it as "dulcet adolescent vocals, and a thorough grasp of commercial rock dynamics producing an appealing sound redolent of the early Undertones". The band played Reading festival 1998. Courtney enjoyed the experience of touring and recording, and teamed up with his brother, Alper and several others to form the indie pop band The Sunset Sound, which received some airplay before the band members dissolved the band as not representing their style. The band's music was also inspired by a university project in which Courtney was involved creating new original music for the 1960s television show The Prisoner.

Along with his brother and Alper, Courtney came together with Greg Jong and Jim Dobson, whom Courtney met at the University of Westminster, to form Pure Reason Revolution. The band's name was inspired by Courtney's thesis on the nature of genius and its application to Beach Boy Brian Wilson, for which he studied Critique of Pure Reason by Immanuel Kant.

Songwriting
According to Alper, the music of Pure Reason Revolution "grew organically from Jon's songs and influences". The band's prevalent use of harmony, described by Disorder Magazine as a "trademark", is credited to Courtney. Courtney's songwriting draws together the inspiration of such bands as Nirvana, which he describes as his "first obsession", the Beach Boys, the Chemical Brothers and Crosby Stills & Nash. In 2005, Gigwise.com, who termed Courtney the "creative force" behind the band, described the "amazingly intricate" songs as "one of the most enticing things" about Pure Reason Revolution. Another reviewer both praised and criticised the song composition, noting that the band had grasped the attributes of Jimi Hendrix and Pink Floyd and "...rammed as much of them into their songs as is humanly possible. Besides that they add more by having around about 9 to 10 synthesisers on 1 rack (very stable), a violinist and a female singer. This is what really created the band in my opinion, but in places also let them down. Their songs were quite long-winded with very little vocals and to say they had 2 singers it led them into a bit of a slump."

Lyrically, Courtney expresses an interest in writing about "the less obvious", stating that he writes "subconsciously about snapshots of life, observations, moments, my and other people's experiences, dreams". Dreams, and the time individuals spend asleep, are among what Alper describes as Courtney's obsessions, which, she notes, "kind of trickle down to us". Courtney acknowledges that his lyrics are often directly inspired by his dreams, which he frequently writes down.

Amor Vincit Omnia (PRR's second LP) was released March 2009 on Superball Music, displaying a considerably more developed electronic sound. Classic Rock Magazine gave the album 8/10 and commented, "once other-worldly, PRR now sound like some mutant offspring of The Chemical Brothers & NIN". NME affirmed the progression with a review stating "they fuse electro with Smashing Pumpkins-style guitar-thrashing. In a world of musical conservatism, this lot walk unafraid". Courtney described the reason for the change of style in an interview:

Pure Reason Revolution's third album, Hammer and Anvil, continued some of these themes, though the thematic focus shifted from love to war. Courtney claims he was inspired by "researching my ancestry; specifically Great Granddad & his role in WW1… I'm staggered by the sheer enormity, the valour, the dead, the mass destruction." According to Rock Sound, "the band have retained most of their heavy hooks to create a great crossover record. A track like 'Last Man Last Round' will fit into many Pendulum fans' heads, whereas their progressive elements are still prevalent in 'Open Insurrection'".

DJ
 Cedo Simplex: Courtney has made a name as a DJ independent of Pure Reason Revolution. He plays regular club nights as part of the DJ set All Bangers, No Mash, using the pseudonym Cedo Simplex which he also used to release a remix of the Pure Reason Revolution single "Victorious Cupid".
KC Blitz: Along with Jamie Kossoff (K), Courtney (C) has made remixes (as of July 2010) for five different bands under this moniker, including Asking Alexandria, The Word Alive, Boxer Rebellion, Norma Jean, and Bring Me the Horizon.  The remixes were released on these bands' respective albums, including on Bring Me the Horizon's all-remix album Suicide Season: Cut Up! and Asking Alexandria's Stepped Up and Scratched.

Equipment
Guitars
 Sunburst Fender Jazzmaster
 Candy Apple Red Fender Jaguar
 Blue Fender Jaguar
 Blue Fender Telecaster – Rarely used. Often used by PRR guitarist Jamie Willcox.

Basses
 Salmon Pink Fender Bronco Bass – only used live for "Asleep Under Eiderdown".

Strings
 Ernie Ball Regular Slinky's (tuned to either Drop D or C)
 Ernie Ball Skinny Top, Heavy Bottom for "Deus Ex Machina" and "In Aurelia" (tuned to Drop B)

Effects/Amplification
 Binson Echo Unit
 Boss Effects
 Line 6 Effects
 Marshall Amplification

Synthesizers
 Teisco 110F

References

Year of birth missing (living people)
Living people
English rock guitarists
People from Reading, Berkshire
People educated at Reading Blue Coat School
English rock singers
Pure Reason Revolution members